The Isaac Lee Patterson Bridge, also known as the Rogue River Bridge and the Isaac Lee Patterson Memorial Bridge, is a concrete arch bridge that spans the Rogue River in Curry County, Oregon. The bridge was constructed by the Mercer Fraser Company of Eureka, California. The bridge carries U.S. Route 101 across the river, near the point where the river empties into the Pacific Ocean, and connects the towns of Gold Beach and Wedderburn. A bridge with strong Art Deco influences, the Isaac Lee Patterson Bridge is a prominent example of the designs of the Oregon bridge designer and highway engineer Conde McCullough. It was designated a National Historic Civil Engineering Landmark by the American Society of Civil Engineers in 1982. It is part of a series of notable bridges designed by McCullough for the Oregon Coast Highway in the 1930s. It was placed on the National Register of Historic Places in 2005.

History
The Oregon State Highway Department awarded the $568,181.00 ($ in  dollars) construction contract to the Mercer, Fraser Company of Eureka, California, on January 16, 1930. Work began on the bridge at Gold Beach in April 1930. In order to avoid problems with concrete shrinkage that had plagued concrete arch bridges in the past, McCullough used the Freyssinet method of pre-tensioning the arches during construction using hydraulic jacks, using sixteen 250-ton jacks from Freyssinet's firm, enough to work with two arch panels at a time. McCullough's design was the first usage of this technique in the United States. The remote location of the building site presented a significant challenge, with reinforcing steel shipped southward from Port Orford, and built a concrete plant on the north bank of the river. Pilings for the piers were obtained locally. The bridge was planned to open in January 1932, but the ferry Rogue was damaged in December 1931 flooding and the bridge opened early, on December 24, 1931. It was dedicated on May 28, 1932 and named after Isaac Lee Patterson, the governor of Oregon from 1927 to 1929. The Mercer-Fraser Company presented the new bridge to the State on January 21, 1932, and the bridge was officially accepted as complete on January 27, 1932, at a final cost of $592,725.56.

Description
Piers 1 and 8, at the ends, rest on solid rock. The intermediate piers rest on driven timber pilings. Piers 2, 4, 5, and 7 rest on 180 vertical piles, while piers 3 and 6, required to resist lateral thrust, have 260 piers driven at an angle.

The detailing of the bridge incorporates Art Deco motifs, with prominent pylons at the ends with stepped Moderne elements and stylized Palladian windows crowned by sunbursts. The railings use a simplified, rectilinear Tuscan order with arches on short ribbed columns.

The bridge has required extensive preventive maintenance to mitigate deterioration due to the location's salt air. A $20 million rehabilitation ran from 2001 to 2004. A previous project in 1976 mitigated scouring problems at pier 2.

Designation

The Isaac Lee Patterson Bridge was placed on the National Register of Historic Places on August 5, 2005.

Further reading

See also

List of bridges documented by the Historic American Engineering Record in Oregon
List of bridges on U.S. Route 101 in Oregon
List of bridges on the National Register of Historic Places in Oregon

References

External links

Road bridges on the National Register of Historic Places in Oregon
Bridges completed in 1932
Open-spandrel deck arch bridges in the United States
U.S. Route 101
Historic Civil Engineering Landmarks
Concrete bridges in Oregon
Art Deco architecture in Oregon
National Register of Historic Places in Curry County, Oregon
Transportation buildings and structures in Curry County, Oregon
Historic American Engineering Record in Oregon
Bridges by Conde McCullough
Bridges of the United States Numbered Highway System
Gold Beach, Oregon